James Gogarty was born in the town of Nobber County Meath, in Ireland on 23 March 1890.

He rose to prominence as an Irish Rebel in the Easter Rising of 1916. Following a brief period of incarceration in the Welsh Prisoner of War Camp, Frangoch, where he first met future Hero Michael Collins, he returned to Ireland and rejoined the I.R.B. In 1921 he became the first known I.R.B. casualty of the Irish War of Independence. A life size bust of Gogarty remains on display inside Leinster House today, which is the seat of the Irish Parliament.

1890 births
1921 deaths
Members of the Irish Republican Brotherhood
People from County Kildare